Herbert St. John Nicol (12 April 1873 in Birmingham – 10 February 1950 in North Vancouver, British Columbia, Canada) was a British rugby union player who competed in the 1900 Summer Olympics. He was a member of the British rugby union team, which won the silver medal.

References

External links

 

1873 births
1950 deaths
British rugby union players
Rugby union players at the 1900 Summer Olympics
Olympic rugby union players of Great Britain
Olympic silver medallists for Great Britain
Medalists at the 1900 Summer Olympics
Rugby union players from Birmingham, West Midlands